Vespasiano is a municipality in the Belo Horizonte metropolitan region in the Brazilian state of Minas Gerais, located  north of Belo Horizonte.

Vespasiano is home to Cidade do Galo, the training grounds of Campeonato Brasileiro Série A team Atlético Mineiro. FASEH, a higher learning institution, is also located in the city.

See also
 List of municipalities in Minas Gerais

References

External links 
 Official site

Municipalities in Minas Gerais